Jean Philippe Rolin (born June 14, 1949, Boulogne-Billancourt) is a French writer and journalist.  He received the Albert Londres Prize for journalism in 1988, and his novel L'organisation received the Medicis award in 1996.

His brother Olivier Rolin is also a writer.

As students, Rolin and his brother participated in the May 1968 uprising.

Bibliography
 Journal de Gand aux Aléoutiennes (Roger Nimier Prize 1982)
 L'Or du scaphandrier, 1983
 Vu sur la mer, 1986
 La Ligne de Front (Prix Albert Londres 1988)
 La Frontière belge, 1989
 Chemins d'eau, 1992
 Cyrille et Méthode, 1994
 Joséphine, 1994
 Zones, 1995
 L'Organisation (Prix Médicis 1996)
 Traverses, 1999
 Campagnes, 2000
 La Clôture, 2002
 Chrétiens, 2003
 Terminal Frigo, 2005
 L'Homme qui a vu l'ours (Prix Ptolémée 2006)
 L'explosion de la durite, 2007
 Un chien mort après lui, 2009
 Le Ravissement de Britney Spears, 2011
 Ormuz, 2013
 Les Événements, 2015
 Savannah, 2015
 Peleliu, 2016
 Le Traquet kurde, 2018
 Crac, 2019

References

People from Boulogne-Billancourt
1949 births
Living people
20th-century French novelists
21st-century French novelists
20th-century French journalists
21st-century French journalists
French travel writers
Prix Médicis winners
Albert Londres Prize recipients
Roger Nimier Prize winners
Prix Valery Larbaud winners
Prix Jean Freustié winners
French male essayists
French male novelists
20th-century French essayists
21st-century French essayists
Winners of the Prix Broquette-Gonin (literature)
Prix Louis Guilloux winners
20th-century French male writers
21st-century French male writers